The Six Days of Frankfurt was a six-day track cycling race held annually in Frankfurt, Germany.

Winners

References

Cycle races in Germany
Six-day races
Recurring sporting events established in 1911
Recurring sporting events disestablished in 1983
1911 establishments in Germany
1983 disestablishments in Germany
Defunct cycling races in Germany